The Asia/Oceania Zone was one of the three zones of the regional Davis Cup competition in 2000.

In the Asia/Oceania Zone there were four different tiers, called groups, in which teams competed against each other to advance to the upper tier. The top two teams in Group IV advanced to the Asia/Oceania Zone Group III in 2001. All other teams remained in Group IV.

Participating nations

Draw
 Venue: Al Hussein Sports City, Amman, Jordan
 Date: 24–30 April

  and  promoted to Group III in 2001.

Results

Bahrain vs. United Arab Emirates

Oman vs. Fiji

Jordan vs. Brunei

Saudi Arabia vs. Oman

Bahrain vs. Fiji

Jordan vs. United Arab Emirates

Saudi Arabia vs. Brunei

Oman vs. Jordan

Fiji vs. United Arab Emirates

Saudi Arabia vs. Jordan

Bahrain vs. Oman

United Arab Emirates vs. Brunei

Saudi Arabia vs. United Arab Emirates

Bahrain vs. Jordan

Fiji vs. Brunei

Saudi Arabia vs. Fiji

Bahrain vs. Brunei

Oman vs. United Arab Emirates

Saudi Arabia vs. Bahrain

Oman vs. Brunei

Jordan vs. Fiji

References

External links
Davis Cup official website

Davis Cup Asia/Oceania Zone
Asia Oceania Zone Group IV